Pilodeudorix tenuivittata is a butterfly in the family Lycaenidae. It is found in the Democratic Republic of the Congo, from the north-eastern part of the country to the Ituri Rainforest. The habitat consists of primary forests.

References

Butterflies described in 1951
Deudorigini
Endemic fauna of the Democratic Republic of the Congo